The National One Day Cup was the national domestic List A (one-day) cricket competition in Pakistan. Due to frequent reorganisations by the Pakistan Cricket Board, at different times there have been one or more competitions involving teams representing either regional associations or departments (or a mix of the two), during the same season, resulting in multiple domestic one-day champions in those seasons.

History
The first domestic one-day competitions in Pakistan were short-lived, starting with PTV Trophy which was held in 1971-72, the Servis Cup which was held in 1974–75 and 1975–76, United Bank Limited (UBL) Trophy and the Habib Bank Gold Cup were held. The first long-standing competition was the Wills Cup, introduced in 1980–81, sponsored by the Pakistan Tobacco Company. Except for 1984–85, it was played every season until 1998–99 when it was renamed the Tissot Cup.

In 2000–01, the competition was split as the One Day National Tournament, with one tournament for regional associations and one for departments. Since then, the competition has fluctuated between single and separate competitions and has had many different names, reflecting various sponsorship agreements.

Winners

See also
National T20 Cup

Notes

References

 
Pakistani domestic cricket competitions
List A cricket competitions
Defunct cricket competitions